Gorki is the name of several inhabited localities in Russia:
Gorki Leninskiye, an urban-type settlement in Moscow Oblast, Russia
Gorki-2, a settlement in Moscow Oblast, Russia
5-ye Gorki, a village in Moscow Oblast, Russia
Gorki-10, a settlement in Moscow Oblast, Russia
Gorki Sukharyovskiye, a village in Moscow Oblast, Russia
Gorki, name of about 160 rural localities in Russia, including:
 Gorki, Baninsky selsovet, Fatezhsky District, Kursk Oblast, a selo
 Gorki, Bolshezhirovsky selsovet, Fatezhsky District, Kursk Oblast, a khutor
 Gorki, Soldatsky selsovet, Fatezhsky District, Kursk Oblast, a khutor
 Gorki, Medvensky District, Kursk Oblast, a khutor
 Alternative spelling of former name of Nizhny Novgorod, Russia.

References

ru:Горки#Населённые пункты